Youri Sourkov (born 4 November 1970 in Almaty) is a Kazakh former cyclist.

Major results

1992
1st Overall Vuelta Ciclista de Chile
1993
1st Stages 1 & 3 Troféu Joaquim Agostinho
2nd Overall Tour du Maroc
1998
1st Stage 13 Tour of Portugal
1999
2nd Overall Gran Premio Internacional Mitsubishi MR Cortez
1st Stage 2 
2000
1st Overall Troféu Joaquim Agostinho
2nd Overall Gran Premio Internacional Mitsubishi MR Cortez
2nd Overall Volta ao Alentejo
1st Stage 1

References

External links

1970 births
Living people
Kazakhstani male cyclists
20th-century Kazakhstani people
21st-century Kazakhstani people